Varosh maala is an old neighborhood in Kumanovo, North Macedonia. It existed in the time of the Ottoman empire and it is considered the oldest neighborhood in Kumanovo. Today the Eski mosque and the Macedonian Telecommunication building stand on the site of the old district.

The neighborhood was initially settled only by Christians. The first Turk to move there was Bislim-beg; after him more Turkish Muslims inhabited the area. Some of the Christian inhabitants then moved across the river to found a new neighborhood, Novo maalo, near today's Church of St. Nikolas.

Neighbourhoods in North Macedonia
Kumanovo